Anthony Sean Ramos Bursiaga (born February 5, 2003) is an American professional soccer player who plays as a goalkeeper.

Club career
Ramos began his career with in the youth system of Major League Soccer side LA Galaxy. He made his professional debut for the club's reserve side, LA Galaxy II, in the USL Championship on October 3, 2020 against Phoenix Rising. He came on as a 62nd minute for Abraham Romero as LA Galaxy II were defeated 4–1.

International career
Ramos is eligible to play for the United States or Mexico.

Ramos was called up to the Mexico U-20 squad to participate at the 2022 Revelations Cup, but did not receive any minutes on the field during the tournament.

Personal life
Born in the United States, Ramos is of Mexican descent.

Career statistics

Club

Honors
Mexico U20
Revelations Cup: 2022

References

External links
Profile at the USL Championship website

2003 births
Living people
American soccer players
Association football goalkeepers
LA Galaxy II players
USL Championship players